Paragalasa is a genus of moths of the family Pyralidae. It contains only one species, Paragalasa exospinalis, which is found in Arizona.

The wingspan is 19–22 mm. The forewings are pale reddish-ochreous, the costa irrorated with fuscous, especially at the base and at the origin of the antemedial and postmedial lines. The hindwings are light pinkish to brownish-white with a darker terminal line.

References

Chrysauginae
Pyralidae genera
Monotypic moth genera